Charnas is a surname. Notable people with the surname include:

Arielle Charnas (born 1987), American online fashion influencer
Dan Charnas (born 1967), American author, radio host, and record company executive
Spencer Charnas ( 2000–present), American musician, lead singer of the band Ice Nine Kills
Suzy McKee Charnas (1939–2023), American novelist